Diphosphorus trisulfide (sometimes called phosphorus trisulfide) is a phosphorus sulfide with the formula of . The substance is highly unstable and difficult to study.

History 
Early reports that diphosphorous trisulfide could be formed by heating red phosphorus and sulfur were shown to be incorrect by Helff in 1893. Its existence was again reported by Ralston and Wilkinson in 1928. In 1959, Pitochelli and Audrieth showed that the substance existed by X-ray diffraction but did not succeed in fully isolating it. In 1997, Lohr and Sundholm published a theoretical analysis of the potential structures of this molecular substance.

Xiao suggested that nanoribbons and nanotubes of the material may have applications in semiconductor electronics.

Properties
 is highly flammable. The solid may spontaneously ignite with moist air or in contact with water. Produces phosphoric acid and hydrogen sulfide, a toxic flammable gas in reaction with water.  is a strong reducing agent. Reacts vigorously with oxidizing agents, including inorganic oxoacids, organic peroxides and epoxides. Produce acidic and corrosive phosphorus pentoxide and sulfur dioxide when burned.

References

Bibliography 
 Lohr, Lawrence L.; Sundholm, Dage, "An ab initio characterization of diphosphorus trisulfide, ", Journal of Molecular Structure, vol. 413–414, pp. 495–500, 30 September 1997. 
 Pitochelli, A.R.; Audrieth, L.F., "Concerning the existence of diphosphorus trisulfide", Journal of the American Chemical Society, vol. 81, iss. 17, pp. 4458–4460, 1 September 1959. 
 Ralston, A.W.; Wilkinson, J.A., "Reactions in liquid hydrogen sulfide. III thiohydrolysis of chlorides", Journal of the American Chemical Society, vol. 50, iss. 2, pp. 258–264, 1 February 1928. 
 Xiao, Hang, Low-Dimensional Material: Structure-Property Relationship and Applications in Energy and Environmental Engineering (PhD Dissertation), Columbia University ProQuest Dissertations Publishing, no. 10615524, 2017.

Phosphorus compounds
Sulfides